Alsophila fuliginosa, synonym Cyathea fuliginosa, is a species of tree fern native to the islands of Luzon, Biliran and Mindanao in the Philippines, where it grows in forests at an altitude of . The stipe is warty and may also (or instead) have short spines as well as many scattered scales towards the base. These scales are dark, glossy and have fragile edges. Sori occur near the fertile pinnule midvein and are protected by firm, dark indusia.

References

fuliginosa
Flora of the Philippines